South Normanton is a civil parish in the Bolsover District of Derbyshire, England. The parish contains eight listed buildings that are recorded in the National Heritage List for England.  Of these, two are listed at Grade II*, the middle of the three grades, and the others are at Grade II, the lowest grade.  The parish contains the village of South Normanton and the surrounding area, and the listed buildings consist of a country house and its coach house, a church, a former windmill, a former farmhouse, a school and two mileposts.


Key

Buildings

References

Citations

Sources

 

Lists of listed buildings in Derbyshire